Julia Bulette (1832 – January 19/20, 1867), was an English-born American prostitute in Virginia City, Nevada, a boomtown serving the Comstock Lode silver mine. She was murdered in 1867, and French drifter John Millain was quickly convicted and hanged for the crime. Subsequent legends surrounding Julia's life and status as a sex worker and madam have grown over time and become a part of Virginia City folklore.

Origins 
Juliette “Julie” Bulette was born in London and moved to New Orleans with her family in the late 1830s. In about 1852 or 1853, she moved to California, where she lived in various places until her arrival in 1859 in Virginia City, Nevada, a mining boomtown since the Comstock Lode silver strike that same year. As she was the only woman in the area, she became greatly sought after by the miners. She quickly took up prostitution. Jule, or Julia (as she became known), was described as a beautiful, tall, and slim brunette with dark eyes, and refined in manner with a humorous, witty personality.

"Jule" Bulette lived and worked out of a small rented cottage near the corner of D and Union streets in Virginia City's entertainment district. An independent operator, she competed with the fancy brothels, streetwalkers, and hurdy-gurdy girls for meager earnings.

Contemporary newspaper accounts of her gruesome murder captured popular imagination. With few details of her life, twentieth-century chroniclers elevated the courtesan to the status of folk heroine, ascribing to her the questionable attributes of wealth, beauty, and social standing. In reality, Bulette was ill and in debt at the time of her death.

Murder 
On the morning of January 20, 1867, Bulette's partially naked body was found by her maid in her bedroom. She had been strangled and bludgeoned to death. Bulette was buried in Pioneer Cemetery.

A little over a year later, John Millain, a French drifter, was arrested and charged with the crime. On April 24, 1868, he went to the gallows, swearing he was not guilty of having killed Bulette, but had been only an accomplice in the theft of her meager belongings.  Millain's hanging was witnessed by author Mark Twain.

Legacy 
Bulette's legend continued after her death. The Virginia and Truckee Railroad honored her memory by naming one of its richly furnished club coaches after her. Her portrait hung in many Virginia City saloons, and author Rex Beach immortalized her as Cherry Malotte in his novel, The Spoilers. Oscar Lewis in his book Silver Kings reported that Bulette was written about more than any other woman of the Comstock Lode bonanza.  

Only two authentic portraits exist of Bulette; one is a photograph which shows her standing beside an Engine Number 1 fireman's hat. A third photograph, previously identified as her, was most likely that of her maid, who was also named Julia.

The television show Bonanza aired an episode called "The Julia Bulette Story" (Season 1, Episode 6, October 17, 1959) in which Julia is portrayed by actress Jane Greer.

The Virginia City chapter of E Clampus Vitus, a men's historical society, is named #1864 "Julia C Bulette" in her honor. Also named in her honor is Bulette Drive in Carson City, Nevada.

See also
 Prostitution in the United States

Notes

References

Further reading
 Blackburn, George M., and Sherman L. Ricards. "The prostitutes and gamblers of Virginia City, Nevada: 1870." Pacific Historical Review 48.2 (1979): 239–258. online
 Butler, Anne M. Daughters of joy, sisters of misery: prostitutes in the American West, 1865-90 (University of Illinois Press, 1987).
 
 James, Ronald Michael, and C. Elizabeth Raymond, eds. Comstock women: the making of a mining community ( University of Nevada Press, 1998).
 McDonald, Douglas. The Legend of Julia Bulette: And the Red Light Ladies of Nevada (Stanley Paher, 1983).
 Ringdal, Nils Johan. Love for sale: A world history of prostitution (Grove/Atlantic, Inc., 2007).
 West, Elliott. "Scarlet West: The oldest profession in the trans-Mississippi West." Montana: The Magazine of Western History 31.2 (1981): 16–27.

External links
Court transcript, NC608. Special Collections, University Libraries, University of Nevada, Reno. Nevadan brought to trial for the murder of Julia Bulette in 1867.

1832 births
1867 deaths
19th-century American women
1867 murders in the United States
American prostitutes
American brothel owners and madams
Sex workers murdered in the United States
American murder victims
People from Virginia City, Nevada
English emigrants to the United States
People from London
People of the American Old West
People murdered in Nevada
Deaths by strangulation in the United States
Deaths by beating in the United States
19th-century American businesspeople
Female murder victims